Guanine nucleotide-binding protein G(t) subunit alpha-1 is a protein that in humans is encoded by the GNAT1 gene.

Transducin is a 3-subunit guanine nucleotide-binding protein (G protein) which stimulates the coupling of rhodopsin and cGMP-phosphodiesterase during visual impulses. The transducin alpha subunits in rods and cones are encoded by separate genes. This gene encodes the alpha subunit in rods. Alternative splicing of this gene results in two transcript variants.

References

Further reading

External links